Tomas Gösta Tranströmer (15 April 1931 – 26 March 2015) was a Swedish poet, psychologist and translator. His poems captured the long Swedish winters, the rhythm of the seasons and the palpable, atmospheric beauty of nature. Tranströmer's work is also characterized by a sense of mystery and wonder underlying the routine of everyday life, a quality which often gives his poems a religious dimension.<ref name="PE">{{cite news |title=Straight into the Invisible: A Swedish Poet's Explorations |first=Stephan |last=Salisbury |url=http://articles.philly.com/1987-03-25/news/26223103_1_psychologist-explorations-poets/3 |newspaper=The Philadelphia Inquirer|year=1987 |access-date=20 October 2011}}</ref> He has been described as a Christian poet.

Tranströmer is acclaimed as one of the most important Scandinavian writers since the Second World War. Critics praised his poetry for its accessibility, even in translation. His poetry has been translated into over 60 languages. He was the recipient of the 1990 Neustadt International Prize for Literature, the 2004 International Nonino Prize, and the 2011 Nobel Prize in Literature.

Life and work

Early life
Tranströmer was born in Stockholm in 1931 and raised by his mother Helmy, a schoolteacher, following her divorce from his father, Gösta Tranströmer, an editor. He received his secondary education at the Södra Latin Gymnasium in Stockholm, where he began writing poetry. In addition to selected journal publications, his first collection of poems, 17 Poems, was published in 1954. He continued his education at Stockholm University, graduating as a psychologist in 1956 with additional studies in history, religion and literature. Between 1960 and 1966, Tranströmer split his time between working as a psychologist at the Roxtuna center for juvenile delinquents (sv) and writing poetry. He also worked as a psychologist at the Labor Market Institute in Västerås from 1965 to 1990.

Poetry
Tranströmer is considered to be one of the "most influential Scandinavian poet[s] of recent decades". Tranströmer published 15 collected works over his extensive career, which have been translated into over 60 languages. An English translation by Robin Fulton of his entire body of work, New Collected Poems, was published in the UK in 1987 and expanded in 1997. Following the publication of The Great Enigma, Fulton's edition was further expanded into The Great Enigma: New Collected Poems, published in the US in 2006 and as an updated edition of New Collected Poems in the UK in 2011. He published a short autobiography, Minnena ser mig (The Memories see me), in 1993.

By the mid-1960s, Tranströmer became close friends with poet Robert Bly. The two corresponded frequently, and Bly would translate Tranströmer's poems into English. In 2001 Bonniers, Tranströmer's publisher, released Air Mail, a work consisting of Tranströmer's and Bly's day-to-day correspondence on personal, contemporary and literary matters c. 1965–1991 – in a style that vividly conveyed how close friends the two had soon become. Bly also helped arrange readings for his fellow poet in America. The Syrian poet Adunis helped spread Tranströmer's fame in the Arab world, accompanying him on reading tours.

In the 1970s, other poets accused Tranströmer of being detached from his own age, since he did not deal overtly with social and political issues in his poems and novels. His work, though, lies within and further develops the Modernist and Expressionist/Surrealist language of 20th-century poetry; his clear, seemingly simple pictures from everyday life and nature in particular reveals a mystic insight to the universal aspects of the human mind. A poem of his was read at Anna Lindh's memorial service in 2003.

Tranströmer went to Bhopal immediately after the gas tragedy in 1984, and alongside Indian poets such as K. Satchidanandan, took part in a poetry reading session outside the plant.

Tranströmer suffered a stroke in 1990 that left him partially paralyzed and unable to speak; however, he continued to write and publish poetry through the early 2000s. One of his final original volumes of poetry, Den stora gåtan, was published in 2004, translated into English in 2006 as The Great Enigma.

Music
Tranströmer played the piano throughout his life; after his stroke, which paralyzed the right side of his body, he taught himself to play only with his left hand. He often said that the playing was a way for him to continue living after the stroke.Poetry Foundation "Tomas Tranströmer Plays Piano in New Short Doc on New Official Website" 1 November 2011Jean-Pierre Thiollet, 88 notes pour piano solo, Neva Editions, 2015, p.154-155. 

Tranströmer's daughter Emma is a concert singer. In 2011 she released the album Dagsmeja, containing songs based on Tranströmer's poems.

Many composers and musicians have worked with his poems. Among these are Jan Garbarek, Ulf Grahn, Madeleine Isaksson, Margareta Hallin, Lars Edlund, Sven-David Sandström, Jan Sandström and Anders Eliasson.

Death
Tranströmer died in Stockholm on 26 March 2015 at 83, less than 3 weeks before his 84th birthday.

List of works
Books of poetry
 17 Poems (17 dikter), Bonniers, 1954
 Secrets on the Way (Hemligheter på vägen), Bonnier, 1958
 The Half-Finished Heaven (Den halvfärdiga himlen), Bonnier, 1962
 Bells and Tracks (Klanger och spår), Bonnier, 1966
 Seeing in the Dark (Mörkerseende), Författarförlaget, 1970
 Paths (Stigar), Författarförlaget, 1973, 
 Baltics (Östersjöar), Bonnier, 1974
 The Truthbarrier (Sanningsbarriären), Bonnier, 1978, 
 The Wild Market Square (Det vilda torget) Bonnier, 1983, 
 For the Living and the Dead (För levande och döda), Bonnier, 1989
 The Sorrow Gondola (Sorgegondolen), Bonnier, 1996, 
 Prison (Fängelse), Edition Edda, 2001 (from 1959), 
 The Great Enigma (Den stora gåtan), Bonnier, 2004, 

Other
 Memories Look at Me (Minnena ser mig), Bonnier, 1993, prose memoir 
 Air Mail: Brev 1964-1990, Bonnier, 2001, correspondence with Robert Bly 
 Galleriet: Reflected in Vecka nr. II (2007), an artist book by Modhir Ahmed

Translations of his work
in English 
 Twenty Poems tr. Robert Bly, Seventies Press, 1970
 Night Vision: Mörkerseende tr. Robert Bly, London Magazine Editions, 1972, SBN 900626 74 7
 Windows and Stones tr. May Swenson & Leif Sjoberg, University of Pittsburgh Press, 1972; 
 Selected Poems, Tomas Tranströmer, tr. Robin Fulton, (included with Paavo Haavikko), Penguin Modern European Poets, 1974; 
 Baltics: Östersjöar, tr. Samuel Charters, Oyez, Berkeley, 1975 ; new edition Tavern Books 2012,  
 Baltics: Östersjöar, tr. Robin Fulton, Oasis Books, London, 1980; 
 Selected Poems, translator Robin Fulton, Ardis Publishers, 1981, 
 The Blue House: Prose Poems, Thunder City Press, 1983
 The Wild Market Square: Det vilda torget tr. John F. Deane, Dedalus Press, Dublin, 1985; 
 Collected Poems, Translator Robin Fulton, Bloodaxe Books, 1987, Tomas Tranströmer: Selected Poems, 1954–1986, Editor Robert Hass, Publisher Ecco Press, 1987 
 Sorrow Gondola: Sorgegondolen, tr. Robin Fulton, Dufour Editions, 1994, ; Dufour Editions, Incorporated, 1997, 
 For the Living and the Dead: För levande och döda, tr. John F. Deane; The Dedalus Press, Dublin, 1994; 
 New Collected Poems tr. Robin Fulton, Bloodaxe Books, 1997, 
 Selected Poems Transtromer, Translator May Swenson, Eric Sellin, HarperCollins, 1999, 
 The Half-Finished Heaven tr. Robert Bly, Graywolf Press, 2001, 
 The Deleted World tr. Robin Robertson, Enitharmon Press, 2006, ; Enitharmon Press, 2006, 
 ; republished 2011
 The Sorrow Gondola tr. Michael McGriff and Mikaela Grassl, Green Integer, 2010, 
 The Deleted World tr. Robin Robertson, Farrar, Straus and Giroux USA, Enitharmon Press UK, 2011; 
 New Collected Poems tr. Robin Fulton, expanded edition Bloodaxe Books, 2011,  
 Inspired Notes, tr. John F. Deane, Dedalus Press, Dublin, 2011 (combining his 1985 and 1994 translations above); 
 Bright Scythe: Selected Poems by Tomas Tranströmer, tr. Patty Crane, Bilingual edition, Sarabande Books, 2015; 

in other languages
 Hanns Grössel has translated several works of Tranströmer into German.
 Roberto Mascaró has translated Tranströmer's work into Spanish.
 Morteza Saghafian has translated Tranströmer's work into Persian.
 Maria Cristina Lombardi translated some works of Tranströmer into Italian.
 Jacques Outin translated them into French.
 Milan Richter has translated the collected poems of Tranströmer into Slovak (Medzi allegrom a lamentom, 2001)

Awards and honours

1966: Bellman Prize (Sweden)
1981: Petrarca-Preis (Germany)
1990: Neustadt International Prize for Literature (US)
1990: Nordic Council Literature Prize, for For the Living and the Dead (Nordic countries)
1991: Swedish Academy Nordic Prize (Sweden)
1992: Horst Bienek Prize for Poetry (Germany)
1996: Augustpriset, for Sorgegondolen (Sweden)
1998: Jan Smrek Prize (Slovakia)
2003: Struga Poetry Evenings Golden Wreath (Macedonia)
2004: International Nonino Prize (Italy)
2007: The Griffin Trust, Lifetime Recognition Award (Griffin Poetry Prize) (Canada)
2011: Title of Professor, granted by the Cabinet of Sweden (Sweden)
2011: Nobel Prize in Literature (Sweden)

Other awards include the Övralid Prize and the Swedish Award from International Poetry Forum.

See also
List of Nobel laureates in Literature

References

External links

The Official Tomas Tranströmer Website
 Petri Liukkonen. "Tomas Tranströmer". Books and Writers Biography and Poems on Poets.org
List of Works
 Biographical profile on Bloodaxe Books website
 Griffin Poetry Prize Lifetime Recognition tribute, including audio and video clips
 Sorrow Gondola translated by Patty Crane, with essay by David Wojahn, letter from Jean Valentine, and more in Blackbird, Spring 2011, Vol. 10, No. 1.
  Translations by Robert Archambeau and Lars-Håkan Svensson.
 Poetry Fix video on Tranströmer
 The Guardian: Tomas Tranströmer 'surprised' by Nobel prize for literature - video interview
 "Wonderful Centipedes: The Poetry of Tomas Tranströmer", Niklas Schiöler, Berfrois'', 12 October 2011
 Steven Ford Brown. "An Afternoon With Tranströmer In Stockholm", Boston Area Small Press and Poetry Scene, October 15, 2011
 "The Blue House" reading by Louise Korthals in Amsterdam, Netherlands, The Official Tomas Tranströmer Website
The Music Says Freedom Exists. A visit to Tomas Tranströmer in Stockholm, February 2015 Video by Louisiana Channel
  including the Nobel Lecture

1931 births
2015 deaths
Nobel laureates in Literature
Nordic Council Literature Prize winners
Writers from Stockholm
Stockholm University alumni
Swedish-language poets
Swedish-language writers
Swedish Nobel laureates
Struga Poetry Evenings Golden Wreath laureates
Litteris et Artibus recipients
Swedish male poets
Swedish translators
August Prize winners
Haiku poets
20th-century Swedish poets
21st-century Swedish poets
20th-century translators
21st-century translators